Pocket-Greenhaven (also known as The Pocket) is a suburban community within the city of Sacramento, California, 5 miles south of downtown Sacramento. It is bordered by Interstate 5 on the east and a semi-circular "pocket" bend in the Sacramento River on the south, west, and north. The three exits into the Pocket-Greenhaven community off Interstate 5 are 43rd Avenue (southbound only), Florin Road, and Pocket/Meadowview Road.  Entering the area from the South on Interstate 5, travelers pass a landmark water tower with the words "Welcome to SACRAMENTO AMERICA'S FARM-TO-FORK CAPITAL" painted on it, marking the southern boundary of the city of Sacramento.  The water tower was originally blank and looked very much like a spaceship alongside wheat and barley fields.  Pocket-Greenhaven is located in the 95831 Zipcode.

Neighborhood residents
The Pocket-Greenhaven neighborhood is in the Southwest area of Sacramento which is now primarily populated by upper, upper-middle, and middle-class families. Original homeowners are generally older and live in Pocket-Greenhaven's periphery, while newer residents are typically younger and reside more centrally. Home construction in the neighborhood began in the early 1960s, and over the years, several noteworthy have resided within the community, including Hollywood Actor Eddie Murphy (whose then-wife Nicole Mitchell Murphy, is a Sacramento native), and members of the Sacramento Kings professional basketball team. Current Assembly Speaker Anthony Rendon (politician), a resident of Los Angeles County, maintains a home in the Greenhaven section of the district. Former State Senate President and current Sacramento mayor Darrell Steinberg resides in Greenhaven. Delaine Eastin, former Superintendent of Schools for California and Assembly member from Union City, CA lived in the Pocket section while serving as Superintendent but now resides in Davis, CA.  The California Air Pollution Control Officers Association's Executive Director Tung Le lives in the Pocket.

The Pocket-Greenhaven neighborhood is a low-crime neighborhood, overall. There are two private lakes and 18 public parks in the Pocket-Greenhaven neighborhood.

Schools
The main high school is John F. Kennedy High School, established in 1967. The School of Engineering and Sciences, a smaller middle and high (i.e. secondary) school, opened in 2010.  Primary schools include Brookfield School, the Caroline Wenzel Elementary School (K-6), Genevieve Didion Elementary School (K-8), Pony Express Elementary School (K-6), Martin Luther King Jr. Elementary School (K-8), Matsuyama Elementary School (K-6), John Cabrillo Elementary School (K-6), and Sam Brannan Middle School (7–8). Bear Flag Elementary school (K-6), the original elementary school serving the area since 1964, closed in 2007.

Development and History
Before settlement, the Pocket-Greenhaven area was a riparian forest with woods of deciduous broad-leaves growing beside the river and streams in the bend.  The center of the bend is a few feet lower than sea level, and drainage was all toward the swampy, tule filled middle. The bend is 6.8 square miles, has highly fertile alluvium soil, and contains a clay pit that is now known as Lake Greenhaven or Greenhaven Lake.  An early development name was Lake Greenhaven Shores. 

Before Europeans came, the Maidu Native American Indian tribe most likely inhabited the bend in the summer months when they could fish and hunt. Longtime residents say the bend contains a number of mounds, suggesting that the Maidu also buried their dead here. John Sutter and his crew likely passed by the Pocket-Greenhaven area on their way to establishing New Helvetia and Sutter's Fort. After the Gold Rush, immigrants and former miners began to inhabit the bend. Several Portuguese families were the first settlers to the area. They raised cattle, hogs, and chickens and grew wheat and barley in the fertile soil, and engaged in dairying.

For the most part, early white settlers did not buy land in the bend because it was considered to be swampland. The majority of the inhabitants found in the area before its development were Portuguese immigrants from a group of islands called the Azores as well as Chinese. This was a sparsely populated farming area until the mid-20th century when developers had a vision for this river community. Most were farmers who drained their farmland and produced lettuce, cabbage, grain, onions, potatoes, tomatoes, sugar beets, milo, spinach, and asparagus, and raised chickens, pigs and cows. They also had pear, walnut, and orange orchards and grew hay to be pressed for sale. These farmers were basically subsistence farmers, the crops were grown for their family's survival. Later crops were sold to stores in downtown Sacramento and to miners during the Comstock Lode.

Other economic activities by the Portuguese included a gasoline service station owned by Frank Enos; Grangers Dairy, owned by the Seamas Family; Da Rosa Grocery store, owned by the Da Rosa family; Pimentel's Ingleside Cafe owned by Tony Pimentel (this cafe is now known as "The Trap"); a slaughterhouse owned by Faustino Silva, and Frank & George Rogers Trucking Co., which delivered hay and produce to customers. The Portuguese created their own schools, known as Upper and Lower Lisbon Schools so that their children could receive an education and at the same time stay close to their cultural roots.

Levees along the Sacramento River were built and maintained by the Portuguese. One major flood, the Edwards levee break in 1904, occurred while the Portuguese farmed the area.  Ferries were then available to transport people to the town of Freeport and across the river to West Sacramento. Some rides were free, while others cost a quarter.

Within the bend, the Portuguese led their way of life as though they lived in the old country. They celebrated the Holy Ghost festas annually, attended their community church, St. Mary's, every Sunday, and displayed a communal affection for a landscape that reminded them of their homeland. According to Mary Tash and her daughter Lucille Carter, in the old days people would leave their farming equipment on the comers of their parcels of land so that others could use the equipment. It was a community of trust and helping others through difficult times that is less apparent in today's society.

The Pocket-Greenhaven area had a brickyard within its boundaries. The Sacramento Brickyard Co. was established in 1854 and was considered to be the first brickyard in Northern California. In its earlier days, Chinese migrant laborers dug clay out of the clay pit and hauled it by mule to the brickyard. The brickyard was strategically placed next to the river so bricks could be transported easily to downtown Sacramento and San Francisco. Bricks from this yard were used for the foundation of the State Capitol. the Memorial Auditorium, and other well-known buildings in the region.  After World War I, a sizeable Japanese population came to the bend and established a peaceful co-existence with the Portuguese community. The area continued on as a sparsely inhabited farming community until mid-century plans were beginning to be formulated for the area.

In 1958 the first developers, The Lincoln and Parker Development Co. bought the King and Zacharias ranches acquiring more than 700 acres in the area for a "planned community" known as "Greenhaven '70."  Before any subdivision could be approved by the city, however, Lincoln & Parker was required to present their proposed plan for the Pocket's entire 4,674 acres. This plan was known as the Pocket Area General Development Plan and included schools, a shopping center, two churches, a hospital with medical offices, a social-cultural center with a library and a theater, gas stations, a teen center, an open space pavilion, a heliport, a nursery, a motel, a hotel, various shops, a firehouse and a restaurant.

1959  Following the annexation of the area in 1959,  the Greenhaven area was incorporated into the City of Sacramento. The city's Planning Commission passed the general development plan for the area on July 11, 1961. On Sept. 7 of that year, the city council adopted the plan. After this, the land was assessed and zoned urban even though it was still agricultural, causing higher property taxes for the farmers. Many of the farmers could not keep up with these higher taxes due to less profitability in farming and had to sell their land.

1961–62 the new "Greenhaven 70"'''' project was acclaimed in 1962 the "Best Planned Community of the Year" by the National Association of Home Builders. An advertisement from the same year recognizes Greenhaven 70 as "the start of tomorrow" and notes that this then-future community will present "a new and better way of living for the entire family."
The name "Greenhaven 70" was coined as the development would center around the long greenbelt (known as Frank Seymore Park,) between Greenhaven and Havenside Drives on the East & West and Riverside Blvd. and Gloria Drive on the North and South.  The completion of this planned community was scheduled to be in 1970.

At that time the only way into the River community were Riverside Road, (now Blvd.) on the northern edge wrapping around to its southern edge. The southernmost edge would later be named Pocket Road.

A sales office was established at Greenhaven Drive and Riverside Blvd. to showcase the plans for the "Greenhaven 70" development and to sell the lots for semi-custom built homes & duplexes.  Parker, Lincoln, Dronberger, Harris, and Machado were some of the first builders to this newly planned community. Greenhaven Drive was the major through-fare which then ended at Moonlit Circle.

Ground breaking by home builders in the new "Greenhaven 70" community began in 1961–62 with the first home in 1961 being built at 9 Moonlit Circle. A spec home was constructed at 805 Royal Garden Ave. because of the home's challenging floor plan, which later included a second story addition, was not immediately sold. Another at 819 Royal Garden Ave. was built for Bill Hallisey, a former conservationist for the state Department of Agriculture. 1962 saw 5–6 homes completed on the 6200–6300 block of Greenhaven Drive, and over 21 being completed on the north side of Moonlit Circle. McKay Construction Co. purchased continuous lots on Moonlit Circle and built homes on almost the entire street, some of the residents were concerned that these houses would be tract houses and would detract from the standards of the original plans for the area. The rest of the area was still rambling fields.

Some of the first original homeowners of "Greenhaven 70" were:
(1)Antone "Tony" Terra, (2)Bob Bos, (3)Norman Greenslate, (4)Bob Dias, (5)Richard Corum, (6)Even Zacharias, (7)Ellsworth "Jack" Zacharias (8)Norman Magee, (9)The Files Family, (10)The Parsons Family and (11)The Schumacher Family, and on the lake for Greenhaven'70 the Gould Family, the Robert Stein Family, The Dr. Donald Carson Family, The George Heringer Family, The Chan Family, The Yuen Family.

With the signing of sales contracts for Greenhaven 70 lots, the purchasers were required to sign an agreement that listed restrictions pertaining to the building and maintenance of their homes. The establishment of the Greenhaven Homeowners Association was formed to enforce the subdivision's restrictions, underground utility and telephone lines would be installed making it so no overhead wiring to homes or television antennas would be visible. This agreement required property owners to place their television antennas either horizontally across the lower part of their rooflines or set them inside their attic, closest to the location of their main television set. To avoid unsightly appearances, garage doors were not to be left open and automobile were not to be parked on streets for extended periods of time nor were cars to be mechanically worked on anywhere on those streets.
Residents with motor homes were required to park these vehicles behind the frontage, fenced area on their property. Items such as basketball standards were not permitted anywhere on the fronts of the homes or along the streets, and garbage cans were required to be kept behind fenced areas and to not be visible from the streets. Distances from the sidewalks to the fronts of homes were standardized, along with no two driveways being allowed to be located side by side. Whenever there was an infraction of any rule, the objecting homeowner would inform the association of the violation, so that the association could ensure a correction.
 
The Greenhaven Cabana Club at 6207 Riverside Blvd. a private swim club for residents was opened. Through the signing of the sales contracts and the restrictions papers, homeowners were entitled to a membership. Dues for upkeep and other expenses of the club were paid by home owners. A second Cabana Club – Greenhaven Cabana Club South – was later opened at 6615 Gloria Drive.

1963–65 saw a large number of homes being completed on Parklin Ave, Royal Green Ave, Starlit Circle, Royal Garden Ave. Streets were added on the west side of Seymore Park and building began on Lakeshore, Shoreline and Spingbrook Circles.  Bear Flag Elementary School was opened in 1964–65 at the end of the park at 6620 Gloria Drive. The plan for the area also included pedestrian bridges for the safety of school children and residents on thoroughfare streets such as Riverside Boulevard and the future Gloria Drive extension. In 1967 John F. Kennedy High School on Gloria Drive opened its doors to the neighborhood. The proposed addition of the first apartment complexes in the late 1960s on the corners of Greenhaven Drive and extending East and West on Riverside Blvd. was met with some opposition of homeowners even though they were included in original area plans, fearing they would detract from the safety and security that all had moved there to enjoy. Home building continued to extend southward on Greenhaven Drive past Gloria Drive as the street continued in the mid-1960s into the 1970s. As homes continued to be built towards the south on Greenhaven Drive and Havenhurst Ave. a sub-area was coined called "Green Acres." The north section of Greenhaven 70 was completed prior to its southern portion. During the final stages of the building of the last homes on the subdivision's north side,  By that time, the proposed shopping center for the subdivision had been revised, because the city council had decided to nullify this small shopping center in favor of the much larger Florin Mall on Florin Road.

Late 1960s-1970s

The building of homes was a slower process in the Greenhaven Lake area. This portion of the area grew as streets were added and paved and model homes were opened for inspection. The Greenhaven Marina, which was proposed in the subdivision's original plan, was later rejected by the Army Corps of Engineers, because of the need to cut into the levee, which would create a greater possibility of flooding in the area. Another portion of the subdivision's original plan that was later rejected was the greenbelt around Lake Greenhaven. Kermit Lincoln filed for bankruptcy in the late 1960s, which resulted in Harold Parker and Lincoln splitting up their remaining assets, which included lots that were designated for apartments in the Riverside Boulevard section of the subdivision. The proposed greenbelt around what was to become Lake Greenhaven was affected by these turn of events and the greenbelt area was offered back to the city for a parkway. However, the city declined this offer, which resulted in this area being zoned for large lakefront lots. The old brickyard closed on January 3, 1971 due to encroaching suburban development and the selling of surrounding parcels which became Greenhaven Lake. These custom built lakefront homes would develop their own "Lake Greenhaven Homeowners Association."  Because the greenbelt was not going to be enjoyed by all the residents who had planned on it for relaxation and entertainment purposes, the surveyor pegs for designated lots suddenly disappeared late one evening. Jack Parker, manager of Greenhaven 70, informed residents near the greenbelt area that this action was unacceptable and costly to L & P. Unfortunately for L & P, after a second set of surveyor pegs were placed on these lots, the dastardly event reoccurred much to the consternation of Jack, who became furious by the event and demanded retribution. Fortunately for the property's developer, after the third set of pegs was placed on this property, the pegs remained without an incident. But an ongoing disappointment remained in the minds of those original residents who purchased lots in the subdivision and were promised this special place to relax and enjoy.

The Lake Association published a newsletter affectionately titled The Seagull which Dr. Bernard Kitt largely wrote and edited with an air of fun and conviviality and great humor. The Seagull connected neighbors to Association sponsored events such as annual regattas, paddleboat races and fishing derbies, and pot lucks which brought residents together with a sort of tongue-in-cheek take on much larger tonier events in exclusive locations. By the '80s no one seemed to take the helm and community events mostly ended.  

1970s

In 1969, a large billboard was erected on Riverside Blvd. advertising "Greenhaven II." with more semi and custom built homes being built to the West towards what is now the intersection at Florin Rd. Bill Parker, who was the son of Harold Parker, was responsible for the remaining portion of Greenhaven 70 in the mid-1970's. All of the proposed 1,600 homes, which were mentioned in the original Greenhaven 70 plan, were eventually completed. And because of the loss of the marina, the plan for 1,200 apartment buildings was exceeded. The final portion of Greenhaven 70 was sold and completed by Morrison Homes, which constructed houses and streets in the loop street pattern in accordance to the original plan for the area. The 1970s saw the addition more small shops, and a supermarket on Riverside Dr and Florin Rd. several apartment complexes, and the areas first condominium development called "Roundtree" on Florin Rd. and Gloria Drive. In the mid 1970s, the section of I-5 which gave Greenhaven direct freeway access was completed with entrances and exits at Seamas & 43rd Aves. After the completion of Greenhaven 70, which is today known by its shortened name of Greenhaven, Bill Parker continued to work as a land developer in other notable areas. Regardless of the changes and disappointments of some features of Greenhaven 70 that did not materialize, many residents to the original area are still proud to call Greenhaven 70 their home.

1980s-1990s "The Pocket"

The major building boom came to the neighborhood in the 1980's and early 90's with homes and subdivisions popping up yet further South and West, filling the entire "Pocket" with gated communities of custom built homes, duplexes, condominiums, apartment complexes, the addition of several parks, schools, small business and yet another private lake. It is during this time that the area became referred to as "the Pocket Area." Florin Rd. was extended into the area, during this time Greenhaven Drive was extended through the entire area coming to an end just past Pocket Rd. The Interstate 5 freeway added 2 more on-ramps and off-ramps for the area, Florin Rd. and Pocket Rd. bring the total freeway access points to a total of four. By 1986 the last Portuguese farming family sold their land to Lincoln/Parker & Powell/Teichert Development Co. The Dutra House located on Pocket Road and Greenhaven Drive was historically preserved, largely by the Parker Development Co. (formerly Lincoln & Parker), and now serves as a Title Company. The Pocket-Greenhaven area is a dense suburban community which now completely fills the semi-circular bend of the Sacramento River.

References

3. Area Resident since 1963

4. Greenhaven Pocket Neighbors Newsletter

5. www.valcomnews.com

External links
 Pocket Area website
 Sacramento's Greenhaven/Pocket Area, Arcadia Publishing (October 28, 2001), 

Neighborhoods in Sacramento, California
Populated places on the Sacramento River